Dol hareubangs, also called tol harubangs, hareubangs, or harubangs, are large rock statues found on Jeju Island off the southern tip of South Korea. They are considered to be gods offering both protection and fertility and were placed outside of gates for protection against demons travelling between realities.

Description
Dol hareubangs are carved from porous basalt (volcanic rock) and can be up to three metres high. The statues' faces feature grinning expressions, bulging eyes without pupils, a long, broad nose, and slight smile, and their hands rest on their bellies, one slightly above the other. In sets of two, one has a higher left hand, and the other a higher right hand. The hat is commonly described as phallic or mushroom-like.

Etymology
The name dol hareubang derives from the Korean word for "stone" (dol 돌), plus the Jeju dialect word hareubang (하르방), meaning "grandfather" or "senior" (harabeoji [할아버지] in Standard Korean), and was coined in the mid-20th century. Other earlier names for the statues include beoksumeori, museongmok, and useongmok. Beoksumeori, meaning shaman head, is used in the former area of Jeongui Hyeon (county), museongmok in Daejeong Hyeon and Jeongui Hyeon, and useongmok only in Jeju Hyeon. Historically, the Tamna Chronicles called them  ongjungseok (옹중석/翁仲石), but this usage is unknown today.

History

There are two main theories as to the origin of dol hareubangs: either that they were introduced by visitors from the sea, or that they are a counterpart to the jangseungs (totem poles) of mainland Korea. Jangseungs are also called beoksu in southern Korea, and this similarity with the name beoksumeori lends credence to the second theory.
   
According to the Tamnaji a work dealing with the geography of Jejudo, the first dolhareubang was manufactured in 1754. Dol hareubangs produced from 1763 to 1765 once stood outside the eastern, western, and southern gates of the Jeju City fortress as guardian deities.

Dol hareubangs today

Dol hareubangs have become the symbol of Jeju Island, and replicas of various sizes are sold as tourist souvenirs.  The statues are sometimes sold as sources of fertility, and small replicas are sometimes given to women with fertility problems. The origin of this may have more to do with Jeju Do's present-day status as a "honeymoon island" than tradition.

See also
Kurgan stelae
Dendroglyph
Jangseung
Korean shamanism
Shigandang
Lingam
Moai
Religion in Korea

References

External links

Jeju's symbol: Dolhareubang at Jeju Special Self-governing Province website

Religion in Korea
Religion in South Korea
Korean culture
Colossal statues
Stone sculptures
Outdoor sculptures in South Korea
Korean folk religion
Korean traditions
Culture in Jeju Province